Semyon Petrovich Uritsky (March 2, 1895 – August 1, 1938) was a Soviet General. He fought in the Imperial Russian Army during World War I before going over to the Bolsheviks. He was promoted to the rank of Komkor on November 11, 1935. He was a recipient of the Order of the Red Banner. He was head of the Soviet military intelligence from April 1935 to July 1937. During the Great Purge, he was arrested on November 1, 1937 and later executed at Kommunarka. He was rehabilitated in 1956.
He was a nephew of Moisei Uritsky.

Bibliography

References 

1895 births
1938 deaths
People from Cherkasy
People from Kiev Governorate
Ukrainian people of World War I
Russian military personnel of World War I
People of the Russian Civil War
Uritsky
Recipients of the Order of the Red Banner
Great Purge victims from Ukraine
Jews executed by the Soviet Union
Soviet Jews in the military
GRU_officers
Soviet rehabilitations
Frunze Military Academy alumni